Billy (stylised as BILLY) is a bookcase sold by the Swedish furniture company IKEA. It was developed in 1979 by the Swedish designer Gillis Lundgren and IKEA have sold over 60 million units of the bookcases worldwide. Its popularity and global spread has led to its use as a barometer of relative worldwide price levels.

Construction
The shelf parts are made of plastic-coated or veneered particle board. The edges are covered with plastic strips. The shelves are placed on metal support, the holes in the side walls have a distance of 32 mm. The shelves are available in several colours and finishes and a width of 40 or 80 cm. The bookshelves can be coupled and optional doors can be added. The bookcases are sold in flat-pack form, to be assembled by the purchaser. Billy is manufactured for IKEA by Gyllensvaans Möbler at their factory in Kattilstorp, Sweden. In 2009, 130,000 bookshelves were produced each week.

History
The bookcase was designed in 1979 by Gillis Lundgren, IKEA's fourth employee. His initial sketches for the bookcase were done on the back of a napkin. When designing the product, emphasis was given to functionality and flexibility recognising that different homes had different requirements and space availability. Lundgren also believed that the bookcase was an item of furniture that consumers may later wish to add additional capacity to as their collections expanded, and wanted to ensure his design was "attractive and timeless" so that the design would remain on sale and didn't fall out of fashion. The name Billy was chosen by Lundgren after an IKEA advertising manager named Billy Liljedahl stated that he wanted "a proper bookcase just for books" to be designed.

The bookcase's first inclusion in the IKEA Catalogue was in the 1979 edition. Initially the bookcases were 90cm wide, but this was revised to 80cm in 1988 following complaints from customers that the shelves bent under the weight of the books and the item didn't fit on IKEA transport pallets.

In 1992, a German newspaper and television station conducted tests on 18 Billy bookshelves and found that the formaldehyde vapour levels released by 8 of them was higher than permitted by regulation. The source of the vapour was traced to the lacquer used by the company on the bookshelf, and IKEA was forced to stop all production and sale of the bookshelves until the problem could be rectified. The cost to IKEA of the incident was estimated to be between $6 and $7 million.

In 2009 Bloomberg instigated a "Billy bookcase index", as an alternative to the Big Mac index, to compare relative price levels in different countries around the world. 

From 2011 to 2014 Billy was available as a 40 cm deep variant alongside the standard 28 cm deep versions. In 2014, reinforced shelves and rounded edges were introduced.

Sales
IKEA estimates that on average one Billy bookcase is sold every five seconds. In 2009, IKEA stated that they had sold 41 million of the bookcases. In 2017 the BBC reported that sales had exceeded 60 million units.

Gallery

References

IKEA products
Individual models of furniture